Saint Afan's Church (SN68387192) is located in Llanafan,  east of Aberystwyth, Ceredigion, in Wales.

History
The original church on the site is credited to Saint Afan in the 6th century.

During the medieval period, the church was an outlying chapelry of Llanbadarn Fawr. The church lies within the upper division of the hundred of Ilar of Cardiganshire. For a great many years the tithes went to the Chichesters of Arlington, Devon, England. They are not known to have contributed to the church building, which for centuries was accepted as the responsibility of the Vaughan family of Trawsgoed.

In 1741, John Vaughan, 2nd Viscount Lisburne, was buried at Llanafan church in the family vault, and since then heads of the family and their wives have usually been buried there. The church was substantially remodelled early in the 19th century and completely rebuilt in 1873 by Ernest Vaughan, 4th Earl of Lisburne.  A notable grave in the churchyard is that of Joseph Butler, a gamekeeper on the Vaughans' Trawsgoed estate, who was shot dead by a poacher, Wil Cefn Coch, in 1868. The killer escaped to Paddy's Run, Ohio (near present-day Morgan in Butler County), with the help of local people and died there in 1920.

The present building

The present structure was remodelled in 1832. It is unclear when it was originally constructed, although a structure most probably existed much further back in time as the lands surrounding the church have belonged to the Vaughan family of Trawsgoed and their decadents since the 1200.  As explained by Samuel Lewis, 1833:
The church is an ancient structure, consisting of a nave, chancel, and south transept; part of the ancient screen which separated the chancel from the nave is still remaining, and exhibits an elegant specimen of carved work; the ancient font, octangular in form, is also preserved. Among the communion plate is a curious ancient dish of silver, gilt, and embossed with twelve figures, of which ten represent warriors, and the other two dragons; all are arranged in couples, and engaged in combat. The church is situated within half a mile of the river, and in the churchyard is a fine avenue of trees, leading from the entrance of the cemetery to the south transept.
The building is noted for the high quality of the early 20th-century stained glass memorials to members of the Vaughan family. A copy of the Welsh Bible of 1620 is on permanent display. Two Vaughan family funeral hatchments are displayed in the chapel.  The church is situated near the river Ystwyth, within Llanafan village, Ceredigion.

Grwp Bro Ystwyth a Mynach
The church lies within the parish of Llanafan y Trawsgoed, which is in the benefice of Grwp Bro Ystwyth a Mynach, the deanery of Llanbadarn Fawr and the Diocese of St David's. As of 2011, the Associate Priest for the parish is I. E. Rose. Anglican services are conducted each Sunday in English and Welsh.

Footnotes

References
 An Essay on the Welsh Saints Or the Primitive Christians, Usually Considered to Have Been the Founders of the Churches in Wales by Rice Rees (1836)
 Yr Eglwys yng Nghymru, the Church in Wales
 Ceredigion, A Wealth of History, Gerald Morgan, Gomer Press, 2005
 ICBS Church Plans Online
 A Welsh House and its Family: the Vaughans of Trawsgoed, Gerald Morgan, Gomer Press, 1999
 A history of the Church of the Cymry, William Hughes, Published 1894, Oxford University
 A Topographical Dictionary of Wales, by Samuel Lewis, 1833
 Headstone Markings of Paddy's Run Old Welsh Cemetery in Shandon, Ohio

External links
 Architects drawing: Llanafan Church

Churches completed in 1873
Llanafan, St Afan
Llanafan
Llanafan, St Afan